The Green Party of South Africa (GPSA) is a small political party in the Western Cape province. It is a member of the Federation of Green Parties of Africa.

History of Green politics in South Africa

The Ecology Party was established in November 1989, but disbanded after recruiting only 1 800 members.

Ian Brownlie launched the Green Party (GRP) in July 1992, but it too disbanded after failing to win a seat in the 1994 Western Cape provincial elections under the leadership of Nathan Grant.

Judy Sole founded the Government by the People Green Party (GPGP) in 1999, which she later renamed to The Green Party of South Africa. The party has contested elections as the Green Party of South Africa since the 2000 local elections. Due to the lack of funding the Green Party of South Africa only participated in the 2004 provincial elections but was reconstituted in early February 2019 to contest the provincial elections.

Election results

Provincial elections

! rowspan=2 | Election
! colspan=2 | Eastern Cape
! colspan=2 | Free State
! colspan=2 | Gauteng
! colspan=2 | Kwazulu-Natal
! colspan=2 | Limpopo
! colspan=2 | Mpumalanga
! colspan=2 | North-West
! colspan=2 | Northern Cape
! colspan=2 | Western Cape
|-
! % !! Seats
! % !! Seats
! % !! Seats
! % !! Seats
! % !! Seats
! % !! Seats
! % !! Seats
! % !! Seats
! % !! Seats
|-
! 1994
| - || -
| - || -
| - || -
| - || -
| - || -
| - || -
| - || -
| - || -
| 0.1% || 0/42
|-
! 1999
| - || -
| - || -
| - || -
| - || -
| - || -
| - || -
| - || -
| - || -
| 0.15% || 0/42
|-
! 2004
| - || -
| - || -
| - || -
| - || -
| - || -
| - || -
| - || -
| - || -
| 0.21% || 0/42
|-
! 2019
| - || -
| - || -
| - || -
| - || -
| - || -
| - || -
| - || -
| - || -
| 0.13% || 0/42
|}

See also
eThekwini ECOPEACE
Green movement in South Africa

References

External links
Green Party of South Africa (2018)
Cape Town Greens (2007)
Gauteng Greens

1999 establishments in South Africa
Environmental organisations based in South Africa
Green political parties in South Africa
Political parties established in 1999
Political parties in South Africa